The Reimer–Tiemann reaction is a chemical reaction used for the ortho-formylation of phenols; with the simplest example being the conversion of phenol to salicylaldehyde. The Reimer in question was Karl Reimer (1845-1883) not the lesser known Carl Ludwig Reimer (1856-1921).

Reaction mechanism

Chloroform (1) is deprotonated by a strong base (normally hydroxide) to form the chloroform carbanion (2) which will quickly alpha-eliminate to give dichlorocarbene (3); this is the principal reactive species. The hydroxide will also deprotonate the phenol (4) to give a negatively charged phenoxide (5). The negative charge is delocalised into the aromatic ring, making it far more nucleophilic. Nucleophilic attack on the dichlorocarbene gives an intermediate dichloromethyl substituted phenol (7). After basic hydrolysis, the desired product (9) is formed.

Selectivity
By virtue of its 2 electron-withdrawing chlorine groups, carbene (3) is highly electron deficient and is attracted to the electron rich phenoxide (5). This interaction favors selective ortho-formylation.

Reaction conditions
Hydroxides are not readily soluble in chloroform, thus the reaction is generally carried out in a biphasic solvent system. In the simplest sense this consists of an aqueous hydroxide solution and an organic phase containing the chloroform. The two reagents are therefore separated and must be brought together for the reaction to take place. This can be achieved by rapid mixing, phase-transfer catalysts, or an emulsifying agent (the use of 1,4-dioxane as a solvent is an example).

The reaction typically needs to be heated to initiate the process, however once started the Reimer-Tiemann Reaction can be highly exothermic, this combination makes it prone to thermal runaways.

Scope
The Reimer–Tiemann reaction is effective for other hydroxy-aromatic compounds, such as naphthols. Electron rich heterocycles such as pyrroles and indoles are also known to react.

Dichlorocarbenes can react with alkenes and amines to form dichlorocyclopropanes and isocyanides respectively. As such the Reimer–Tiemann reaction may be unsuitable for substrates bearing these functional groups. In addition, many compounds can not withstand being heated in the presence of hydroxide.

Comparison to other methods
The direct formylation of aromatic compounds can be accomplished by various methods such as the Gattermann reaction, Gattermann–Koch reaction, Vilsmeier–Haack reaction, or Duff reaction; however, in terms of ease and safety of operations, the Reimer–Tiemann reaction is often the most advantageous route chosen in chemical synthesis. Of the reactions mentioned before, the Reimer–Tiemann reaction is the only route not requiring acidic and/or anhydrous conditions. Additionally the Gattermann-Koch  reaction is not applicable to phenol substrates.

Variations
The Reimer–Tiemann reaction can be altered to yield phenolic acids by substituting the chloroform with carbon tetrachloride. For instance, the altered reaction with phenol would yield salicylic acid rather than the expected product, salicylaldehyde.

References

Addition reactions
Carbon-carbon bond forming reactions
Name reactions
Formylation reactions